Lutcza  (Liutcha) is a village in the administrative district of Gmina Niebylec, within Strzyżów County, Subcarpathian Voivodeship, in south-eastern Poland.

The village has a population of 2,200.

References

Lutcza